Suzanne Mary Prober (born in Hobart on 31 July 1964) is an Australian botanist and ecologist.

She received her Bachelor of Science in Agriculture (Honors) from the University of Sydney in 1985 and a PhD in Vegetation Ecology from the Australia National University in 1990.

She is a principal research scientist with CSIRO Land and Water in Perth, Western Australia. Understanding, controlling and restoring the natural diversity, ecosystem function and resilience of plant groups are Prober's main research interests. She focuses on temperate eucalypt woodlands and remnant vegetation in versatile landscapes. Prober currently leads the Great Western Ecosystems Research Network, and is Facility Director of TERN (Terrestrial Ecosystem Research Network) OzFlux. OzFlux is responsible for maintaining datastreams that measure the exchange of energy, carbon and water between the atmosphere and important Australian ecosystems.

List of interests 

 Adaptation of natural ecosystems to climate change
 Ecosystem function and management
 Fire ecology
 Aboriginal ecological knowledge
 Conservation and biodiversity
 Plant-soil Interactions; mycorrhizae
 Invasive species ecology
 Temperate eucalypt woodlands

Publications
Prober's research has resulted in over 100 publications since 2009 which can be found in the semi-complete list at http://people.csiro.au/P/S/Suzanne-Prober/PublicationsHistory.aspx.

References

20th-century Australian botanists
Australian ecologists
Plant ecologists
Women ecologists
People from Hobart
1964 births
Living people
20th-century Australian women scientists
21st-century Australian botanists